The men's pole vault event at the 2002 Asian Athletics Championships was held in Colombo, Sri Lanka on 11 August.

Results

References

2002 Asian Athletics Championships
Pole vault at the Asian Athletics Championships